Najneh, also rendered as Najineh, may refer to:
 Najneh-ye Olya
 Najneh-ye Sofla